Cortazzone is a comune (municipality) in the Province of Asti in the Italian region Piedmont, located about  southeast of Turin and about  northwest of Asti.

Main sights

The Romanesque church of San Secondo di Cortazzone is located on the hill of the last, about a kilometre west of the main centre of population. Dating from the 11th century, it is regarded as one of the most significant examples of medieval architecture in the Basso Monferrato. It is included in a well known tourist route called "Percorso del Romanico Astigiano" together with Vezzolano Abbey and San Nazario & Celso chapel in Montechiaro d'Asti, among others.

References

External links
 Official website

Cities and towns in Piedmont